Life of Alexander Nevsky (Zhitiye Aleksandra Nevskogo) is a Russian illuminated manuscript of the late 16th century (1560-1570). It is currently housed in the Saltykov-Shchedrin Public Library in Saint Petersburg, Russia.

The work includes 83 illuminations and text that describe the life and achievements of Alexander Nevsky, a Russian ruler and a military leader, who defended the northern borders of Rus against the Swedish invasion, defeated the Teutonic knights at the Lake Chud in 1242 and paid a few visits to Batu Khan to protect the Vladimir-Suzdal Principality from the Khazar raids.

See also
Life of Alexander Nevsky (an earlier text from the 13th-14th century)
List of illuminated manuscripts

External links
 The full manuscript translated into English

East Slavic manuscripts
Medieval literature
16th-century illuminated manuscripts
Life of Alexander Nevsky (illuminated manuscript)
Cyrillic manuscripts